Mavundirikadavu is a small village in the Palakkad district of Kerala state, south India, and it belongs to Nellaya Panchayath in Pattambi Thaluk.

References

Villages in Palakkad district